Khaled Al-Awadhi (born 13 September 1964) is a Kuwaiti fencer. He competed in the individual and team foil events at the 1980, 1984 and 1988 Summer Olympics.

References

External links
 

1964 births
Living people
Kuwaiti male foil fencers
Olympic fencers of Kuwait
Fencers at the 1980 Summer Olympics
Fencers at the 1984 Summer Olympics
Fencers at the 1988 Summer Olympics